The 2005 ADAC Procar Series season was the eleventh season of the ADAC Procar Series, the German championship for Super 2000 cars. The season consisted of eight separate race weekends with two races each, spread over six different tracks. The championship was won by Mathias Schläppi in a very dominant way, winning 12 out of 16 races.

Teams and drivers

* Guest driver, no points awarded.

Championship standings

References

External links
 Official ADAC Procar Series website

ADAC Procar Series
ADAC Procar Series seasons